Richard Boyle (b 1655 Kingsale; d 1711 Dublin ) was an Irish politician.

The son of Richard Boyle, Bishop of Ferns and Leighlin, he was educated at Trinity College, Dublin. From 1695 until 1699, he was MP for Old Leighlin.

References

Alumni of Trinity College Dublin
Members of the Parliament of Ireland (pre-1801) for County Carlow constituencies
Irish MPs 1695–1699
1655 births
1711 deaths